2016 in women's road cycling is about the 2016 women's bicycle races ruled by the UCI and the 2016 UCI Women's Teams.

World Championships

The World Road Championships is set to be held in Doha, Qatar.

UCI Women's WorldTour

Single day races (1.1 and 1.2)

† The clock symbol denotes a race which takes the form of a one-day time trial.

Stage races (2.1 and 2.2)

Source

Championships

International Games

Continental Championships

Source

UCI teams

The country designation of each team is determined by the country of registration of the largest number of its riders, and is not necessarily the country where the team is registered or based.

References

 

Women's road cycling by year
2016 in sports